The Poughkeepsie–Newburgh–Middletown Metropolitan Statistical Area, as defined by the United States Census Bureau, is an area consisting of two counties in New York's Hudson Valley, with the cities of Poughkeepsie, Newburgh, and Middletown as its principal cities. As of the 2020 census, the MSA had a population of 679,221 The area was centered on the urban area of Poughkeepsie-Newburgh.

The Poughkeepsie-Newburgh-Middletown MSA is a component of the New York–Newark–Bridgeport, NY-NJ-CT-PA Combined Statistical Area, which had an estimated population of 23,582,649 as of the 2020 census.

In February 2013, the MSA was deleted, and the constituent counties became part of the New York-Newark-Jersey City, NY-NJ-PA Metropolitan Statistical Areas. During this time, the counties were split into two metropolitan divisions: Orange County was a part of the New York-Jersey City-White Plains, NY-NJ Metropolitan Division, while Dutchess County was in the Dutchess County-Putnam County, NY Metropolitan Division.  The MSA was restored as a separate entity in September 2018.

Counties
Dutchess
Orange

Communities

Cities
Beacon
Middletown (Principal city)
Newburgh (Principal city)
Port Jervis
Poughkeepsie (Principal city)

Towns

Amenia
Beekman
Blooming Grove
Chester
Clinton
Cornwall
Crawford
Deerpark
Dover
East Fishkill
Fishkill
Goshen
Greenville
Hamptonburgh
Highlands
Hyde Park
LaGrange
Milan
Minisink
Monroe
Montgomery
Mount Hope
New Windsor
Newburgh
North East
 Palm Tree
Pawling
Pine Plains
Pleasant Valley
Poughkeepsie
Red Hook
Rhinebeck
Stanford
Tuxedo
Union Vale
Wallkill
Wappinger
Warwick
Washington
Wawayanda
Woodbury

Villages

Chester
Cornwall-on-Hudson
Fishkill
Florida
Goshen
Greenwood Lake
Harriman
Highland Falls
Kiryas Joel
Maybrook
Millbrook
Millerton
Monroe
Montgomery
Otisville
Pawling
Red Hook
Rhinebeck
South Blooming Grove
Tivoli
Tuxedo Park
Unionville
Walden
Wappingers Falls
Warwick
Washingtonville
Woodbury

Census-designated places

Amenia
Arlington
Balmville
Beaver Dam Lake
Brinckerhoff
Central Valley
Crown Heights
Dover Plains
Fairview
Firthcliffe
Fort Montgomery
Gardnertown
Haviland
Highland Mills
Hillside Lake
Hopewell Junction
Mechanicstown
Myers Corner
New Windsor
Orange Lake
Pine Bush
Pine Plains
Pleasant Valley
Red Oaks Mill
Salisbury Mills
Scotchtown
Spackenkill
Sparrow Bush
Staatsburg
Vails Gate
West Point

Hamlet

Amity
Annandale-on-Hudson
Arden
Barrytown
Bellvale
Bullville
Campbell Hall
Chelsea
Circleville
Cuddebackville
Howells
Huguenot
Linden Acres
Little Britain
Michigan Corners
Mountain Lodge Park
Mountainville
New Hamburg
New Hampton
Pine Island
Pleasant Plains
Rhinecliff
Salt Point
Shekomeko
Slate Hill
Sugar Loaf
Thompson Ridge
Verbank
Wassaic
Westbrookville

Demographics

2010 Census
As of the census of 2010, there were 670,301 people, 233,890 households, and 164,352 families residing within the MSA. The racial makeup of the MSA was 78.50% White, 10.10% African American, 0.40% Native American, 2.90% Asian, 0.03% Pacific Islander, 5.20% from other races, and 2.90%% from two or more races. Hispanic or Latino of any race were 14.7% of the population.

2000 Census
As of the census of 2000, there were 621,517 people, 214,324 households, and 153,660 families residing within the MSA. The racial makeup of the MSA was 83.68% White, 8.64% African American, 0.29% Native American, 1.96% Asian, 0.03% Pacific Islander, 3.31% from other races, and 2.07% from two or more races. Hispanic or Latino of any race were 9.30% of the population.

The median income for a household in the MSA was $52,572, and the median income for a family was $61,805. Males had a median income of $43,970 versus $30,764 for females. The per capita income for the MSA was $22,769.

Colleges and universities
Dutchess County
Adelphi University's Hudson Valley Center in the City of Poughkeepsie
Bard College in Annandale-on-Hudson
Culinary Institute of America's main campus in Hyde Park
Dutchess Community College in the Town of Poughkeepsie
Marist College in the Town of Poughkeepsie
Ridley-Lowell Business & Technical Institute in the City of Poughkeepsie
Vassar College in the Town of Poughkeepsie
Orange County
Mount Saint Mary College in Newburgh
Orange County Community College in Middletown with a satellite campus in Newburgh
United States Military Academy in West Point

Transportation
Major infrastructure includes:
Stewart International Airport, which has scheduled flights on Allegiant Air, American Eagle, Delta Connection, JetBlue Airways and Norwegian Air Shuttle.
Amtrak, with a station at Poughkeepsie.
Metro North's Hudson Line, a commuter rail line serving the eastern Hudson communities
Metro North's Port Jervis Line, a commuter rail line serving Orange County and part of Rockland County
Interstate 87, the eastern section of the New York State Thruway.
Interstate 84, going from Pennsylvania to Massachusetts.
Taconic State Parkway, going from Columbia County to Westchester County.
Commercial bus companies serving Newburgh, and other cities along the Hudson River, ultimately having a destination in Albany or in New York City.

See also

New York census statistical areas

References

External links
Bureau of Labor Statistics - May 2008 Metropolitan and Nonmetropolitan Area Occupational Employment and Wage Estimates

 
Orange County, New York
Dutchess County, New York
Northeast megalopolis
Hudson Valley